Progresu may refer to several villages in Romania:

 Progresu, a village in Sohatu Commune, Călărași County
 Progresu, a village in Făcăeni Commune, Ialomița County